A list of films produced in Russia in 2005 (see 2005 in film).

2005

See also
 2005 in Russia

External links
 Russian films of 2005 at the Internet Movie Database

2005
Films
Russia